Rahmatollah Moghaddam Maraghei was an Iranian politician. A co-founder of the Iranian Writers' Association (IWA), he briefly served as a member of the parliament in the early 1960s, but was ousted for criticizing the Shah.

Career
Following the Iranian Revolution, he was elected to the constituent assembly and was considered among the opposition bloc to the Islamic Republican Party. He went into hiding and fled the country after he was prosecuted for espionage.

He worked as an informant for the Central Intelligence Agency (CIA), under the cryptonym "SDProbe". According to C. Emery, he was a valuable asset for the agency due to his position as a governor and the connections he had among influential figures.

References

External References/Links
 
 Assembly of Experts for Constitution Profile

Governors of East Azerbaijan Province
Members of the Assembly of Experts for Constitution
Iranian writers
Muslim People's Republic Party politicians
People from Maragheh
People from Miandoab
Deputies of Miandoab, Shahin Dezh and Takab
Date of birth unknown
Possibly living people
Exiles of the Iranian Revolution
American spies
Iranian revolutionaries
Members of the 20th Iranian Majlis
People convicted of espionage in Iran
People convicted of spying for the United States
Members of the Iranian Committee for the Defense of Freedom and Human Rights
Iranian Writers Association members